This is a list of rectors of the University of Wrocław (Breslau) from 1811.

Königliche Universität Breslau (1811–1911)

Friedrich-Wilhelms-Universität Breslau (1911–1945)

Wrocław University

Uniwersytet and Politechnika Wrocławska (1945-1952)

Uniwersytet Wrocławski im. Bolesława Bieruta (1952-1989)

Uniwersytet Wrocławski (since 1989)

Sources

 Wojciech Wrzesiński, Uniwersytet Wrocławski 1945-1995, Leopoldinum, Wrocław 1995.
 Teresa Kulak, Mieczysław Pater, Wojciech Wrzesiński, Historia Uniwersytetu Wrocławskiego 1702-2002, Wrocław 2002.

Wrocław